Every Time is the sixth studio album by American country music singer Pam Tillis, released on June 30, 1998 via Arista Nashville. The album peaked No. 26 on the Billboard country albums charts. Singles from the album were "I Said a Prayer" and the title track, which peaked at No. 12 and No. 38 on Hot Country Songs in 1998. "A Great Disguise" was previously recorded by Martina McBride on her 1995 album Wild Angels.

Track listing

Personnel

 Eddie Bayers – drums, percussion
 Richard Bennett – electric guitar
 Beth Nielsen Chapman – background vocals
 Joe Chemay – bass guitar
 Dan Dugmore – dobro, steel guitar
 Glen Duncan – dobro
 Stuart Duncan – fiddle
 Chris Farren – acoustic guitar, mandolin, background vocals
 Larry Franklin – fiddle
 Sonny Garrish – steel guitar
 Tony Harrell – accordion
 Aubrey Haynie – fiddle
 Wes Hightower – background vocals
 John Hobbs – piano, synthesizer
 Carl Jackson – background vocals
 John Barlow Jarvis – piano
 Kirk "Jelly Roll" Johnson – harmonica
 John Jorgenson – electric guitar
 Brent Mason – electric guitar
 Marty McClantoc – engineer
 Greg Morrow – drums
 Steve Nathan – organ, synthesizer
 Suzi Ragsdale – background vocals
 Michael Rhodes – bass guitar
 Brent Rowan – electric guitar
 John Wesley Ryles – background vocals
 Leslie Satcher – background vocals
 Timothy B. Schmit – background vocals
 Alan Schulman – engineer
 Steuart Smith – electric guitar
 Verlon Thompson – background vocals
 Pam Tillis – lead vocals, background vocals
 Billy Joe Walker Jr. – acoustic guitar, electric guitar, gut string guitar, background vocals
 Biff Watson – acoustic guitar
 Dennis Wilson – background vocals
 Lonnie Wilson – percussion
 Glenn Worf – bass guitar

Produced by Billy Joe Walker Jr. and Pam Tillis; additional production by Chris Farren on "We Must Be Thinking Alike"

Chart performance

References

1998 albums
Arista Records albums
Pam Tillis albums
Albums produced by Billy Joe Walker Jr.